...Something to Be is the debut solo album from the Matchbox Twenty lead singer Rob Thomas. The album was released on April 5, 2005, and it debuted at No. 1 on the US Billboard 200 albums chart, knocking out Mariah Carey's The Emancipation of Mimi.

The album spawned the US top ten hit "Lonely No More". It also features John Mayer's guitar on the single "Streetcorner Symphony". The album was released in the DualDisc format, the first major album to be released that way. The album itself is certified Double Platinum by the RIAA in the US and consists of several types of sounds, including dance, pop, Latin, rock, and country, although it can be generally classified as closer to pop than to the rock music of Matchbox Twenty's third studio album, More Than You Think You Are. The album was supported by his 2005–2006 Something to Be Tour.

Critical reception 

Reception for ...Something to Be was mixed. David Browne of Entertainment Weekly said Rob Thomas "sounds less like his usual tortured self and more like a boy-band veteran who still knows a thing or two about a grabby hook" and noting that the single "Streetcorner Symphony" sounds like "the world's greatest Black Crowes parody — until you realize Thomas is completely serious". Browne also commented that the album "doesn't always snap and crackle the way that single ("Lonely No More") does".

Lindsay Whitfield of Soul Shine Magazine also gave the album and some of its songs a positive review (four stars), saying the album is "one of the finest, most unique albums of 2006 so far" and Thomas belts out "musical perfection to the road trip worthy". Thomas Inskeep of Stylus Magazine gave the album a negative review (although the "C" rating reflects a more mixed attitude), calling it "mediocre" and explaining that the large part of the problem was that "Rob's a fairly generic songwriter". Inskeep continued by saying he is "one of the most processed-cheese-and-Wonder-bread guys around" and Thomas had "hopelessly clichéd lines" on the song "Ever the Same".

Kevin Forest Moreau of Paste gave the album a positive review, saying his debut solo album "certainly sounds different from the adult-alternative diet-rock of Matchbox Twenty-at least half the time". Moreau complimented the "punchy horns and a few electronic flourishes" for being on songs such as "Streetcorner Symphony". However, he criticized the "ponderous poetics...and platitudes" for being mistaken as depth. Paul Lingas of avrev.com called the album "a mixed bag with some surprisingly good offerings and some duds that sadly aren’t surprising" (giving the performance a 5.5 and the sound 6.5), complimenting some of the songs but also calling them "background music". He noted that Thomas "does not have a good singing voice". Although he also called his voice very distinctive and strong, he said "too often it is not suited to the surrounding music". Lingas finished by saying that Thomas' voice is not always well blended with the other sounds and that the mixing is "poor" and producing decisions are "sometimes odd".

Track listing

Target bonus CD: ...Something More

Personnel 

 Harley Allen – background vocals
 Matt Beck – background vocals
 Mike Campbell – guitar, soloist
 Cassidy – background vocals
 Kyle Cook – guitar
 Jill Dell'Abate – horn contractor
 Mike Elizondo – bass guitar
 Anika Ellis – background vocals
 Pat Enright – background vocals
 Brandon Fields – saxophone
 Gordon Gottlieb – bells, marimba
 Gary Grant – trumpet

 Greater Anointing – background vocals
 Jonathon Haas – bells, marimba
 Benjamin Herman – bells, marimba
 Jerry Hey – trumpet, horn arrangements
 Gerald Hayward – drums
 Hasan Isakkut – kanun
 Kevin Kadish – guitar
 Frank London – shofar
 John Mayer – guitar and background vocals on "Streetcorner Symphony"
 Wendy Melvoin – guitar (1 to 11)
 John O'Brien – programming

 Joe Passaro – bells, marimba
 Heitor Teixeira Pereora – guitar (3, 10)
 Eric Poland – bells, marimba
 Robert Randolph – lap steel guitar
 Matt Serletic – keyboards, background vocals
 Shari Sutcliffe – horn contractor
 Rob Thomas – piano, lead vocals
 Jeff Trott – guitar (1 to 4, 7, 8, 11)
 Dan Tyminski – background vocals
 Dan Willis – dudok
 Reginald Young – trombone

Charts

Weekly charts

Year-end charts

Certifications

References 

2005 debut albums
Albums produced by Bloodshy & Avant
Albums produced by Matt Serletic
Rob Thomas (musician) albums
Atlantic Records albums
Albums recorded at Henson Recording Studios